Some Like It Hot is a 2016 Chinese romantic comedy film directed by Song Xiaofei and Dong Xu and stars Xiao Yang, Yan Ni, Xiaoshenyang, Qiao Shan, and Ailun. It was released in China on December 30, 2016. It won the Outstanding Film Contribution Award at the Hengdian Film and TV Festival of China

Plot summary
Xiao Han, a man with deep anxiety caused by the tragic death of one of his schoolmates, Queen Wang, has had a boring life for 40 years. The married man then decides to make himself feel young and vibrant again by pursuing beauty. Aided by his three friends, he chases after a gorgeous Korean model named Yoyo. In the midst of this crazy, hilarious endeavour, he unwittingly creates a love-interest misunderstanding with his superior, Miss Ma Lilian—his buddy Ai Mu's crush.

Cast

Reception
The film has grossed  in China.

Production
The movie, with a running time of 113 minutes, was co-produced by the following companies:

 New Classic Media Corporation
 Wanda Media
 Shanghai Ruyi Jiepanxia Film And Television
 Huaxia Film Distribution
 Tianjin Maoyan Media
 iQiYi Pictures

and was distributed by the following companies:

 Xinli Movie Distribution (Tianjin)
 Tianjin Maoyan Media
 Huaxia Film Distribution
 Beijing Baidu Nuomi Information Technology
 Shanghai Tao Piao Piao Entertainmen

References

External links
 

2016 romantic comedy films
Chinese romantic comedy films
Huaxia Film Distribution films
Wanda Pictures films
Tianjin Maoyan Media films
2010s Mandarin-language films